Juan Carlos García (born 6 October 1967) is a Colombian equestrian. He competed at the 1988 Summer Olympics and the 1992 Summer Olympics. He later represented Italy at the 2004 Summer Olympics.

References

1967 births
Living people
Colombian male equestrians
Italian male equestrians
Olympic equestrians of Colombia
Olympic equestrians of Italy
Equestrians at the 1988 Summer Olympics
Equestrians at the 1992 Summer Olympics
Equestrians at the 2004 Summer Olympics
Sportspeople from Bogotá